Grace Jacqueline Hill (17 December 1929 – 18 February 1993) was a British actress known for her role as Barbara Wright in the BBC science-fiction television series Doctor Who. As the history teacher of Susan Foreman, the Doctor's granddaughter, Barbara was the first Doctor Who companion to appear on-screen in 1963, with Hill speaking the series' first words. She played the role for nearly two years.

Hill returned to Doctor Who in 1980 for an appearance in the serial Meglos, as the Tigellan priestess Lexa.

Biography
Hill was orphaned as a toddler and brought up by her grandparents. She was taken out of school at the age of 14 to enable her younger brother to continue. She then worked at Cadbury's, which had an amateur dramatics society. She was encouraged to apply for, and was awarded, a scholarship at the Royal Academy of Dramatic Art, and entered RADA at the age of 16. Hill graduated in 1951.

Hill made her stage debut in London's West End in The Shrike. Many more roles followed, including Fabian of the Yard and An Enemy of the People. In 1958 she married the director Alvin Rakoff, having the previous year appeared in his BBC adaptation of Rod Serling's American TV play Requiem For A Heavyweight. This production featured former bit-part actor Sean Connery; Hill had recommended that Rakoff cast him, because she believed Connery would be popular with female viewers.

She was offered the part of Barbara Wright in Doctor Who, following discussions with producer Verity Lambert about the role. She had first met Lambert when they worked at ABC Weekend TV.

Hill preferred the historical Doctor Who stories; her favourite serials were The Aztecs and The Crusade. Shortly after leaving the series in 1965 she gave up acting in order to raise a family, resuming her career in 1978. Her later TV credits included Tales of the Unexpected and the 1978 BBC Television Shakespeare version of Romeo and Juliet (as Lady Capulet), which was directed by her husband.

In October 1980, she returned to Doctor Who in a guest role, portraying Priestess Lexa, leader of the religiously fanatical Deons, in the story Meglos. By this time the Doctor was played by Tom Baker.

Death
Jacqueline Hill died of breast cancer in 1993, aged 63.

Portrayals
In 2013, as part of the Doctor Who 50th anniversary celebrations, the BBC produced a docu-drama relating the story of the creation and early days of the series, titled An Adventure in Space and Time. Hill appeared as a character in the drama, portrayed by actress Jemma Powell.

Filmography

Film

Television

References

External links

1929 births
1993 deaths
20th-century English actresses
Actresses from Birmingham, West Midlands
Alumni of RADA
Deaths from cancer in England
Deaths from breast cancer
English film actresses
English stage actresses
English television actresses
British Shakespearean actresses